The National Garden Scheme opens privately owned gardens in England, Northern Ireland, Wales, and the Channel Islands on selected dates for charity. It was founded in 1927 with the aim of "opening gardens of quality, character and interest to the public for charity". The scheme has raised over £60 million since it began, and normally opens thousands of gardens a year.

County organisers are responsible for vetting gardens to make sure they are of sufficient interest.
When the scheme began 609 private gardens were opened and £8,191 was raised.  A small number of the original "pioneer" gardens still participate in the Scheme, while many more have joined. Over 3,700 gardens were due to open in 2020 but the impact of COVID-19 meant that most openings were cancelled. However, new online virtual garden tours were introduced. 
Visitor information is published in a publication called The Garden Visitor's Handbook (formerly the Yellow Book). There is another Yellow Book for the separate Scotland's Gardens scheme.

Charities supported
Originally the admission fees raised money for district nurses, although the creation of the National Health Service in 1948 changed the nature of the support required.
In 1980, the National Garden Scheme Charitable Trust was launched as an independent charity with Queen Elizabeth the Queen Mother as patron. The current patron is Charles, Prince of Wales.  
The Queen's Nursing Institute is still one of the charities supported, along with Perennial, Macmillan Cancer Support and others.

See also
Scotland's Gardens
Golf Course Allotments is an example of a site opened each year to the public.

References

Further reading
The Yellow Book, 2014: ngs gardens open for charity. London: National Gardens Scheme

External links

 National Garden Scheme website

1927 establishments in England
Gardening in England
Gardening in Wales
Awards established in 1927
Charities based in Surrey
Guildford
Garden festivals in England
Garden festivals in Wales